Alena Holubeva (born April 4, 1994) is a Belarusian basketball player for Olimpia Grodno and the Belarusian national team.

She participated at the EuroBasket Women 2017.

References

1994 births
Living people
Belarusian women's basketball players
Sportspeople from Grodno
Point guards